Balaji Mandir may refer to a number of temples dedicated to the Hindu deity Balaji, also known as Venkateswara:

India

Rajasthan
 Mehandipur Balaji Temple, a temple of Hanuman in Rajasthan, India
 Punrasar Balaji, a temple of Hanuman in Rajasthan, India
 Salasar Balaji, a temple of Hanuman in Rajasthan, India

Other Indian states
 Balaji Mandir, Pune, in Pashan, Pune, India
 Balaji Temple, Ketkawla, in Pune, Maharashtra, India
 Chilkur Balaji Temple, a temple of Balaji near Hyderabad, India
 Shreebalajimandir, in Mumbai, Kandivali, Charkop, India
 Sri Balaji Temple, T. Nagar, in Chennai, Tamil Nadu, India
 Unao, Balaji, in Madhya Pradesh, India

Elsewhere
 Sri Venkateswara (Balaji) Temple Minnesota, in Edina, Minnesota, US
 Tividale Tirupathy Balaji Temple, in Tividale, West Midlands, England